VPS may refer to:

Science and technology 
 Ventriculo-peritoneal shunt, a neurosurgical method used to treat hydrocephalus
 Video programming system, a standard for video recorders in Germany
 Virtual private server, a method of partitioning a physical server computer into multiple servers
 VPS/VM, a computer operating system
 Kodak Vericolor III, Type S film

Organizations 
 Vaasan Palloseura, a Finnish football club
 Vietnamese Professionals Society, an international organization
 Volkspartei der Schweiz, a defunct Swiss neo-Nazi political party

Other uses 
 Victim Personal Statement, in UK law
 Destin–Fort Walton Beach Airport (IATA code), Florida